Gypsy 83 is an American 2001 drama film, written and directed by Todd Stephens. The film is about two young goths, Gypsy and Clive, who travel to New York for an annual festival celebrating their idol, Stevie Nicks.

Filming took place in Hazleton, Pennsylvania.

Plot
25 year old Gypsy Vale (Sara Rue) and 18 year old Clive Webb (Kett Turton) are two goths living in Sandusky, Ohio. Gypsy's parents, Ray (John Doe) and Velvet (Marlene Wallace), once were in a band together, and Gypsy now aspires to be a famous singer, like her idol, Stevie Nicks. She is hesitant, because of the disappearance of her mother, to leave her father alone in Sandusky to pursue her dreams.

While checking updates on a Stevie Nicks fansite, Clive discovers the Night of a Thousand Stevies event in New York. After a long and heated discussion with Gypsy, her father reveals that her mother didn't just disappear, or die: she left to follow her dream of becoming a famous singer. Despite this, Clive finally convinces Gypsy to go to New York.

Along the way, Gypsy and Clive encounter a diverse host of characters and obstacles. They pick up a hitchhiker named Zechariah, who claims he is running away from the Amish life. Together, the three decide to stop and spend the night at a rest stop. While there, Clive expresses his attraction for Zechariah, but Zechariah says that he's attracted to Gypsy. Clive is embarrassed and runs away. Gypsy is surprised and flattered and as a result, she and Zechariah end up sleeping together. Afterward, Zechariah says that he's made a mistake and needs to return home.

Enraged, Gypsy throws him out of the bathroom where she is staying at the rest stop. Meanwhile, Clive is accosted in secret by Troy, who is also spending the night at the rest stop with his fraternity brothers, and the two have a sexual encounter.

The next morning, while Gypsy and Clive are trying to console each other and make sense out of the events of the previous night, the two are egged and mocked by the fraternity brothers as they leave the rest area while Troy sits silently. They miss the auditions for the Night of a Thousand Stevies, and Gypsy learns that her mother committed suicide four years earlier.

The sympathetic Mistress of Ceremonies, also her mother's best friend when she was in New York, allows Gypsy to perform a song she wrote for her mother at the end of the show. In the end, Gypsy stays in New York to pursue her musical aspirations like her mother, and Clive returns to Sandusky to finish high school but plans to come back to New York after he graduates.

Cast
 Sara Rue as Gypsy Vale
 Kett Turton as Clive Webb
 Karen Black as Bambi LeBleau, a retired singer
 John Doe as Ray Vale, Gypsy's father
 Marlene Wallace as Velvet Vale, Gypsy's mother
 Anson Scoville as Zechariah Peachy, an Amish runaway
 Paulo Costanzo as Troy, a college frat boy
 Carolyn Baeumler as Lois
 Stephanie McVay as Polly Pearl
 Amanda Talbot as Connie
 Vera Beren as Empress Chi Chi Valenti, a goth club matron
 Andersen Gabrych as Banning

Music
The film's original music was composed by Marty Beller. The soundtrack features well known icons of the gothic subculture, such as The Cure, Claire Voyant, and electronic music artists Velvet Acid Christ and Apoptygma Berzerk.There is also a cover of famous song of Stevie Nicks called “Talk to me” by another gothic band Diva Destruction.

Reception

Awards and nominations
Wins
L.A. Outfest
 Grand Jury Award – Outstanding Actor in a Feature Film (Kett Turton) (Tied with Paul Dano in L.I.E. (2001))
Seattle Lesbian & Gay Film Festival
 Award for Excellence – Best New Director (Todd Stephens)
Torino International Gay & Lesbian Film Festival
 Audience Award – Best Feature Film (Todd Stephens)
Toronto Inside Out Lesbian and Gay Film and Video Festival
 Audience Award – Best Feature Film or Video (Todd Stephens)

Nominations
Torino International Gay & Lesbian Film Festival
 Best Feature Film (Todd Stephens)

References

External links
 
 
 
 

2001 films
2000s buddy drama films
2001 drama films
2001 independent films
2001 LGBT-related films
2000s drama road movies
American buddy drama films
American coming-of-age drama films
American independent films
American LGBT-related films
American drama road movies
2001 directorial debut films
2000s English-language films
Films set in Ohio
Films shot in Ohio
LGBT-related coming-of-age films
LGBT-related drama films
Amish in films
Films about singers
Gay-related films
2000s coming-of-age drama films
2000s American films
English-language drama films